Celebrate is the tenth extended play by South Korean boy group Highlight. It was released on October 16, 2017 by Around Us Entertainment and distributed by LOEN Entertainment. 

The album was released to commemorate and celebrate the eighth anniversary of the group's debut. This marks the third time the group has released two albums in one year, following Shock of the New Era and Mastermind in 2010; and Good Luck and Time in 2014. According to Gaon Chart, as of the end of December 2017, the album has sold a cumulative total of 113,154 copies.

The album consists of six tracks, including the lead single "Can Be Better".

Track listing
Credits are adapted from Naver.

Chart performance

References

2017 EPs
Korean-language EPs
Kakao M EPs
Highlight (band) EPs